Mushroom 25 Live is a live album, video and DVD by various Australian musicians and was recorded at the Mushroom 25 Concert held on Saturday 14 November 1998, at the Melbourne Cricket Ground. From the early afternoon until late at night for the nine-hour concert, 56 acts, including many of the biggest names in Australian music, performed their hits to celebrate the 25th anniversary of Mushroom Records, which was organised by its owner, Michael Gudinski. The concert featured former Cold Chisel singer Jimmy Barnes guesting with INXS on "The Loved One" and "Good Times" in tribute of Michael Hutchence for their first public performance since his death in November 1997.

The 1998 VHS comprised 3 video cassettes with a total time of 360 min. By 2002, Gudinski's Liberation Blue Records re-released the concert both on audio as a 2xCD and video as a 2xDVD set. The 2xCD set has 15 tracks each with Disc 1 length of 71: 45, and Disc 2 length of 75:35. The DVD is a double disc set in Dolby Digital 5.1 audio, with a running time of almost six hours and featuring deluxe Digipak packaging. Audio - Dolby Digital 5.1 Regions - 1,2,3,4,5,6. Disc Format - 2 x DVD9. Disc One: 174 Minutes. 
Disc Two: 166 Minutes. Rated ‘E’

Background
Impresario Michael Gudinski and fellow music agent Ray Evans formed Mushroom Records in late 1972. Their first album was an ambitious triple-LP live recording of the 1973 Sunbury Pop Festival. In its first few years Mushroom released albums and singles by some of the most significant Australian rock acts of the period, including Madder Lake, Chain, The Dingoes and Skyhooks. Success with Skyhooks' first few albums followed by Split Enz, Models, INXS, Kylie Minogue and Jimmy Barnes enabled Mushroom to dominate the Australian music industry into the 1990s. In 1982, Mushroom Records celebrated its tenth anniversary by running the Mushroom Evolution Concert which was released as a triple live album and a related VHS. Gudinski sold 49% of his interests in Mushroom Records to rival Festival Records then owned by Rupert Murdoch's News Corporation in 1993 for a reputed $22 million. Gudinski decided to celebrate Mushroom Records' 25th Anniversary with a concert held at the Melbourne Cricket Ground on 14 November 1998. The concert featured former Cold Chisel singer Jimmy Barnes guesting with INXS on "The Loved One" and "Good Times" in tribute of Michael Hutchence for their first public performance since his death. Kylie Minogue emerged from a birthday cake and performed a medley of songs. A month later the album, Mushroom 25 Live was released on CD. Less than a year later, Gudinski sold the remaining 51% to News Corporation's James Murdoch for a reputed $40 million, and it was merged with Festival Records to form Festival Mushroom Records. By 2002, Gudinski's Liberation Blue Records re-released the concert both on audio as a 2xCD and video as a 2xDVD set.

CD track listing
1998 single CD version
 "Leaps and Bounds" – Paul Kelly
 "It's a Man's Man's World" – Renée Geyer
 "Love Comes Easy" – Vika and Linda
 "This Is It" – Dannii Minogue
 "Medley: "Celebration"/"What Do I Have to Do?"/"Step Back in Time"/"Wouldn't Change a Thing"/"Turn It Into Love"/"Confide in Me"/"Shocked"/"Never Too Late"/"Did It Again"/"Hand on Your Heart"/"Better the Devil You Know"/"Celebration" – Kylie Minogue
 "Mysterious Girl" – Peter André
 "It's Alright" – Deni Hines
 "Even When I'm Sleeping" – Leonardo's Bride
 "Tucker's Daughter" – Ian Moss
 "No Aphrodisiac" – The Whitlams
 "Dogs Are Talking" – The Angels
 "Most People I Know Think that I'm Crazy" – Billy Thorpe
 "Lover Lover" – Jimmy Barnes
 "Good Times" – Jimmy Barnes and INXS

VHS Track listing
"Delicious" – Moler
"Pressure Sway" – Machinations
"Change in Mood" – Scott Carne
"Die Yuppie Die" – Painters and Dockers
"Divi Van" – Painters and Dockers
"Time Bomb" – Nick Barker
"Stuck On You" – Paul Norton
"Play the Game" – Wendy Stapleton
"Mighty Rock" – Stars
"Soul Kind of Feeling" – Dynamic Hepnotics featuring Robert Susz
"Green Limousine" – The Badloves
"Black and Blue" – Chain
"I Remember When I Was Young" – Chain
"Where Are You Now?" – Juno Roxas
"Suburban Boy" – Dave Warner
"Don't Fall in Love" – The Ferrets featuring Billy Miller
"A Tale They Won't Believe" – Weddings Parties Anything
"Father's Day" – Weddings Parties Anything
"Hard Land" – Chris Wilson
"I Can't Stand the Rain" – Wilson Diesel
"Love Comes Easy" – Vika and Linda
"Goodbye Lollipop" – Madder Lake
"12lb Toothbrush" – Madder Lake
"Wanna Be Up" – Chantoozies
"Out Of Mind Out Of Sight" – James Freud
"Apple Eyes" – Swoop
"Goosebumps" – Christie Allen
"(Everybody Wants To) Work" – Uncanny X-Men
"This Is It" – Dannii
"All I Wanna Do" – Dannii
"Cry" – The Mavis's
"Naughty Boy" – The Mavis's
"It's Only the Beginning" – Deborah Conway
"Madame Butterfly Is in Trouble" – Deborah Conway
"Took the Children Away" – Archie Roach with Ruby Hunter
"Last Ditch Cabaret" – Mark Seymour
"Holy Grail" – Mark Seymour
"Ghost Ships" – Chris Bailey
"Just Like Fire Would" – Chris Bailey
"Wide Open Road" – Chris Bailey and Paul Kelly
"Heading in the Right Direction" – Renée Geyer
"It's a Man's Man's World" – Renée Geyer
"Strangers on a Train" – The Sports
"Who Listens to the Radio" – The Sports
"Stand-up" – Mick Molloy
"Happy Man" – Sunnyboys
"Alone With You" – Sunnyboys
"Medley" – Kylie Minogue
"Looking for an Echo" – Ol'55
"On the Prowl" – Ol'55
"Leaps and Bounds" – Paul Kelly
"To Her Door" – Paul Kelly
"Throw Your Arms Around Me" – Mark Seymour/Kate Ceberano
"Most People I Know Think That I'm Crazy" – Billy Thorpe and The Aztecs
"Ooh Poo Pah Doo" – Billy Thorpe and the Aztecs
"Run to Paradise" – Choirboys
"Tucker's Daughter" – Ian Moss
"Pash" – Kate Ceberano
"Mysterious Girl" – Peter Andre
"It's Alright" – Deni Hines
"Even When I'm Sleeping" – Leonardo's Bride
"No Aphrodisiac" – The Whitlams
"We Gotta Get Out of this Place" – The Angels
"Dogs Are Talking" – The Angels
"Driving Wheels" – Jimmy Barnes
"Lay Down Your Guns" – Jimmy Barnes
"Lover Lover" – Jimmy Barnes
"Working Class Man" – Jimmy Barnes
"The Loved One" – Jimmy Barnes with INXS The Loved One
"Good Times" – Jimmy Barnes with INXS

2002 Liberation Blue re-release
Disk 1
 "I Remember When I Was Young" – Chain
 "12lb Toothbrush" – Madder Lake
 "Don't Fall in Love" – The Ferrets featuring Billy Miller
 "Mighty Rock" –  Stars
 "Alone With You" – Sunnyboys
 "Ghost Ships" – Chris Bailey
 "On the Prowl" – Ol'55
 "Out of Mind Out of Sight" – Models
 "It's a Man's Man's World" –  Reneé Geyer
 "Pressure Sway" – Machinations
 "Soul Kind of Feeling" – Dynamic Hepnotics
 "Stranger on a Train" – Sports
 "Most People I Know Think that I'm Crazy" – Billy Thorpe
 "Tucker's Daughter" – Ian Moss
 "Run to Paradise" – Choirboys

Disk 2
 "Leaps and Bounds" – Paul Kelly
 "Even When I'm Sleeping" – Leonardo's Bride
 "Father's Day" – Things of Stone and Wood
 "Green Limousine" – Badloves
 "No Aphrodisiac" – Whitlams
 "Last Ditch Cabaret" – Mark Seymour
 "Love Comes Easy" – Vika and Linda
 "Madame Butterfly Is in Trouble" – Deborah Conway
 "It's Alright" – Deni Hines
 "Mysterious Girl" – Peter Andre
 "This Is It" – Dannii Minogue
 "Medley" – Kylie Minogue
 "Dogs Are Talking" – Angels
 "Lover Lover" – Jimmy Barnes
 "Good Times" –  Jimmy Barnes & INXS

DVD Track listing

Disc one
 "Delicious" - Moler
 "Pressure Sway" - Machinations
 "No Say in It" - Machinations
 "Change in Mood" - Scott Carne
 "Die Yuppie Die" - Painters and Dockers
 "Divi Van" - Painters and Dockers
 "Time Bomb" - Nick Barker
 "Stuck on You" - Paul Norton
 "Play the Game" - Wendy Stapleton
 "Mighty Rock" - Stars
 "Soul Kind of Feeling" - Dynamic Hepnotics featuring Robert Susz
 "Green Limousine" - The Badloves
 "Black and Blue" - Chain
 "I Remember When I Was Young" - Chain
 "Where Are You Now?" - Juno Roxas
 "Suburban Boy" - Dave Warner
 "Don't Fall in Love" - The Ferrets featuring Billy Miller
 "A Tale They Won't Believe" - Weddings Parties Anything
 "Father's Day" - Weddings Parties Anything
 "AcDc - Chris Wilson
 "I Can't Stand the Rain" - Wilson Diesel
 "Love Comes Easy" - Vika and Linda
 "Goodbye Lollipop" - Madder Lake
 "12lb Toothbrush" - Madder Lake
 "Wanna Be Up" - Chantoozies
 "Out of Mind Out of Sight" - James Freud
 "Apple Eyes" - Swoop
 "Goosebumps" - Christie Allen
 "(Everybody Wants To) Work" - Uncanny X-Men
 "This Is It" - Dannii Minogue
 "All I Wanna Do" - Dannii Minogue
 "Cry" - The Mavis's
 "Naughty Boy" - The Mavis's
 "It's Only the Beginning" - Deborah Conway
 "Madame Butterfly Is in Trouble" - Deborah Conway
 "Took the Children Away" - Archie Roach with Ruby Hunter
 "Last Ditch Cabaret" - Mark Seymour
 "Holy Grail" - Mark Seymour

Disc two
 "Ghost Ships" - Chris Bailey
 "Just Like Fire Would" - Chris Bailey
 "Wide Open Road" - Chris Bailey with Paul Kelly
 "Heading in the Right Direction" - Renée Geyer
 "It's a Man's Man's World" - Renée Geyer
 "Strangers on a Train" - The Sports
 "Who Listens to the Radio?" - The Sports
 "Stand Up" - Mick Molloy
 "Happy Man" - The Sunnyboys
 "Alone With You" - The Sunnyboys
 "Medley: "Celebration"/"What Do I Have to Do?"/"Step Back in Time"/"Wouldn't Change a Thing"/"Turn It Into Love"/"Confide in Me"/"Shocked"/"Never Too Late"/"Did It Again"/"Hand on Your Heart"/"Better the Devil You Know"/"Celebration" – Kylie Minogue
 "Looking For An Echo" - Ol' 55
 "On The Prowl" - (Ol' 55)
 "Leaps and Bounds", (Paul Kelly)
 "To Her Door" - (Paul Kelly)
 "Throw Your Arms Around Me" - (Mark Seymour and Kate Ceberano)
 "Most People I Know Think That I'm Crazy" - (Billy Thorpe)
 "Ooh Poo Pah Doo" - (Billy Thorpe)
 "Run To Paradise" - (The Choirboys)
 "Tucker's Daughter" - (Ian Moss)
 "Pash" - (Kate Ceberano)
 "Mysterious Girl" - (Peter André)
 "It's Alright" - (Deni Hines)
 "Even When I'm Sleeping" - (Leonardo's Bride)
 "No Aphrodisiac" - (The Whitlams)
 "We Gotta Get Out of This Place" - (The Angels)
 "Dogs Are Talking" - (The Angels)
 "Driving Wheels" - (Jimmy Barnes)
 "Lay Down Your Guns" - (Jimmy Barnes)
 "Lover Lover" - (Jimmy Barnes)
 "Working Class Man" - (Jimmy Barnes)
 "The Loved One" - (Jimmy Barnes with INXS)
 "Good Times" - (Jimmy Barnes with INXS)
 "Good Times" - (Reprise) Ensemble

References

External links
Mushroom 25 Live at Australian Rock Database
Liberation Records Official website

Live albums by Australian artists
1998 live albums
Live video albums
1998 compilation albums
1998 video albums
Video albums by Australian artists
Live pop albums
Live rock albums
Live dance music albums
Pop compilation albums
Rock compilation albums
Dance music compilation albums
Pop video albums
Rock video albums
Dance music video albums
Mushroom Records compilation albums
Mushroom Records live albums
Mushroom Records video albums
Compilation albums by Australian artists